The Fire Brigades Union (FBU) is a trade union in the United Kingdom for wholetime firefighters (including officers up to chief fire officer / firemaster), retained firefighters and emergency control room staff.

History
The first recorded instance of trade union organisation of firefighters was when the Municipal Employees' Association recruited several London County Council firemen in early 1905, which by the end of the following year had grown to a branch of 500.

After the entire branch had transferred to the rival National Union of Corporation Workers (NUCW), the branch grew to 1,100 of the 1,300 London firemen and to protect the then branch secretary from potential dismissal, sub-officer E. W. Southgate handed over branch secretaryship to Jim Bradley, a London park-keeper who had been nominated by the union's executive.

Following the strike of police officers on 29 August 1918, Bradley organised a secret ballot of firemen on the issue of strike action over pay and conditions. After winning the right to a representative board for London firemen, the fire brigade branch of NUCW seceded from the union to join the Firemen's Trade Union, what had been a friendly society for around 200 firemen in private brigades led by George Gamble, with Bradley becoming assistant secretary.

In 1930, the union changed its name to the Fire Brigades Union.

Second World War
The Air Raid Precautions Act (1937) contained provisions for recruiting a volunteer force of auxiliaries to supplement existing fire brigades, which were called up on 1 September 1939. The 95,000 called up (89,000 men, 6,000 women) formed the Auxiliary Fire Service (AFS) far outnumbered the around 6,000 full-time regulars. AFS firefighters were on worse conditions, with regular firemen promoted to be their officers. The war emergency also saw the re-instatement of continuous duty service, which was dropped after a week in favour of a 112-hour week.

The question of the AFS transformed the union, the incumbent leadership, headed by General Secretary Percy Kingdom, held that the AFS were dilutees and therefore should be marginalised. This view was challenged by John Horner and other young firemen and over the course of a protracted dispute which saw all the union's full-time officials resign, Horner was elected General Secretary. Horner then began organising auxiliaries, winning endorsement of this at the 1940 conference of the regular section of the union and saw the union's membership increase from 3,500 in 1939 to 66,500 in 1940.

As a result of the London Blitz, the fire service was nationalised in 1941 by the powers of the Fire Services (Emergency Provisions) Bill.

200203 dispute

Led by its then General Secretary Andy Gilchrist, the union called a strike over pay and conditions in 2002, following an independent review of pay carried out by the same organisation that reviewed MPs' pay. The strike did not achieve its goals, and on 5 May 2005 a left wing candidate, Matt Wrack, defeated Gilchrist in the election for General Secretary, attaining 63.9% of the vote cast (12,883 votes) on a total turnout of about 40% of the membership.

2004 disaffiliation
The FBU disaffiliated from the Labour Party in 2004 due to the union's opposition of policies put in place by the then prime minister and party leader, Tony Blair.

201314 dispute
In August 2013, FBU members were balloted with 78% voting in favour of industrial action, in a dispute of pensions. The first strike took place on 25 September 2013 for four hours. Periods of industrial action have continued throughout 2013 and 2014, when the dispute escalated with a 96-hour strike called from 31 October to 4 November 2014.

2015 re-affiliation with Labour
In November 2015, the FBU re-affiliated with the Labour Party due to the union's backing of the party's new leader Jeremy Corbyn and his commitment to anti-austerity politics.

2023 Dispute 
On 30 January 2023 voted to go on strike, with  88% in favour of strike action, on a 73% turnout. On 11 February 2023 the FBU recommended that its members accept a revised pay offer of a 7% rise backdated to July 2022 and a further 5% increase from 1 July 2023, and it postponed planned strike action for workers to vote on the offer.

Election results
The union sponsored Labour Party candidates in several Parliamentary elections.

Officials

General secretaries
19181922 George Gamble
19221929 Jim Bradley
19291939 Percy Kingdom
19391964 John Horner
19641980 Terry Parry
19802000 Ken Cameron
20002005 Andy Gilchrist
2005present Matt Wrack

Assistant general secretaries
1939 Harry Short
1946 Jack Grahl
1957 Tom Harris
1974 Dick Foggie
19822005 Mike Fordham
2005present Andy Dark

Presidents
19391944 Gus Odlin
19441959 John Burns
19591964 Terry Parry
19641977 Enoch Humphries
19771979 Wilf Barber
19791986 Bill Deal
19861991 Stan Fitzsimmons
19911999 Ronnie Scott
19992002 Mick Harper
20022007 Ruth Winters
20072010 Mick Shaw
20112018 Alan McLean
2018present Ian Murray

See also

 National Fire Savers Credit Union
Frank Bailey

References

Further reading
Bailey, Victor (ed.) (1992) Forged in Fire: the history of the Fire Brigades Union. London: Lawrence & Wishart

External links

Catalogue of the FBU archives, held at the Modern Records Centre, University of Warwick

Trade unions in the United Kingdom
Firefighters associations
1918 establishments in the United Kingdom
Trade unions established in 1918
Trade unions affiliated with the Labour Party (UK)
Fire and rescue in the United Kingdom
Trade unions based in London
Trade unions affiliated with the Trades Union Congress